Unorganized South East Algoma District is an unorganized area in the Canadian province of Ontario, comprising a small unincorporated portion in the southeasternmost corner of the Algoma District. It comprises a small strip of land which lies between the territory of the Sagamok First Nation and the Algoma District's boundary with the Sudbury District, as well as several small islands within the North Channel of Lake Huron, such as Eagle, Fréchette, Fox, Hotham, Middleton, North and South Benjamin Islands.

The division comprises  (increased from 41.71 km2 in the 2001 census), and had a reported population of zero in the Canada 2006 Census.

The division includes the historic Fort La Cloche trading post and a small portion of La Cloche Provincial Park.

Demographics
Population trend:
 Population in 2011: 0
 Population in 2006: 0
 Population in 2001: 0
 Population in 1996: 0
 Population in 1991: 0

See also
List of townships in Ontario

References

Geography of Algoma District
Algoma South East